Representative Brown may refer to numerous representatives.

United States Representatives

A
Aaron V. Brown (1795–1859), U.S. Representative from Tennessee
Albert G. Brown (1813–1880), U.S. Representative from Mississippi
Anson Brown (1800–1840), U.S. Representative from New York
Anthony Brown (Maryland politician) (born 1961), U.S. Representative from Maryland

B
Bud Brown (politician) (born 1927), U.S. Representative from Ohio

C
Charles Brown (congressman) (1797–1883), U.S. Representative from Pennsylvania
Charles Elwood Brown (1834–1904), U.S. Representative from Ohio
Charles Harrison Brown (1920–2003), U.S. Representative from Missouri
Clarence J. Brown (1893–1965), U.S. Representative from Ohio
Corrine Brown (born 1946), U.S. Representative from Florida
Charles Browne (politician) (1875–1947), U.S. Representative from New Jersey

E
Edward E. Browne (1868–1945), U.S. Representative from Wisconsin
Elias Brown (1793–1857), U.S. Representative from Maryland

F
Foster V. Brown (1852–1937), U.S. Representative from Tennessee

G
Garry E. Brown (1923–1998), U.S. Representative from Michigan
George Brown Jr. (1920–1999), U.S. Representative from California
George H. Browne (1818–1885), U.S. Representative from Rhode Island
Ginny Brown-Waite (born 1943), U.S. Representative from Florida

H
Hank Brown (born 1940), U.S. Representative from Colorado
Henry E. Brown Jr. (born 1935), U.S. Representative from South Carolina

J
James S. Brown (1824–1878), U.S. Representative from Wisconsin
James W. Brown (1844–1909), U.S. Representative from Pennsylvania
Jason B. Brown (1839–1898), U.S. Representative from Indiana
Jeremiah Brown (politician) (1785–1858), U.S. Representative from Pennsylvania
John Brown (Maryland politician) (died 1815), U.S. Representative from Maryland
John Brown (Pennsylvania politician) (1772–1845), U.S. Representative from Pennsylvania
John Brown (Rhode Island politician) (1736–1803), U.S. Representative from Rhode Island
John Brewer Brown (1836–1898), U.S. Representative from Maryland
John Robert Brown (Virginia politician) (1842–1927), U.S. Representative from Virginia
John W. Brown (New York politician) (1796–1875), U.S. Representative from New York
John Y. Brown (politician, born 1835) (1835–1904), U.S. Representative from Kentucky
John Y. Brown Sr. (1900–1985), U.S. Representative from Kentucky
Joseph Edgar Brown (1880–1939), U.S. Representative from Tennessee

L
Lathrop Brown (1883–1959), U.S. Representative from New York

M
Milton Brown (politician) (1804–1883), U.S. Representative from Tennessee

P
Paul Brown (Georgia politician) (1880–1961), U.S. Representative from Georgia
Prentiss M. Brown (1889–1973), U.S. Representative from Michigan

R
Robert Brown (Pennsylvania politician) (1744–1823), U.S. Representative from Pennsylvania

S
Seth W. Brown (1841–1923), U.S. Representative from Ohio
Sherrod Brown (born 1952), U.S. Representative from Ohio

T
Thomas H. B. Browne (1844–1892), U.S. Representative from Virginia
Thomas M. Browne (1829–1891), U.S. Representative from Indiana

W
Webster E. Brown (1851–1929), U.S. Representative from Wisconsin
William Brown (congressman) (1779–1833), U.S. Representative from Kentucky
William G. Brown Sr. (1800–1884), U.S. Representative from Virginia
William Gay Brown Jr. (1856–1916), U.S. Representative from West Virginia
William J. Brown (Indiana politician) (1805–1857), U.S. Representative from Indiana
William Ripley Brown (1840–1916), U.S. Representative from Kansas
William Wallace Brown (1836–1926), U.S. Representative from Pennsylvania

U.S. state representatives

Alabama
K. L. Brown (born 1951)

Alaska
Fred Brown (Alaska politician) (1943–2014)

Arizona
Jack A. Brown (1929–2015)
Keith Brown (pole vaulter) (1913–1991)

Arkansas
Earnest Brown (judge) (born 1970)
F. E. Brown (1858–1928)

Colorado
George L. Brown (1926–2006)
J. Paul Brown (born 1953)

Connecticut
James Brown (Connecticut politician) (1682–1769)

Florida
Corrine Brown (born 1946)
Gene Brown (politician) (1933–1996)
J. Hyatt Brown (born 1937)
Kamia Brown (born 1980)
Richard Lewis Brown (1854–1948)
Shirley Brown (Florida politician) (born 1952)
Thomas Brown (Florida politician) (1785–1867)
Tom C. Brown (born 1933)

Georgia
Paul Brown (Georgia politician) (1880–1961)

Idaho
L. Edward Brown (born 1937)

Illinois
Michael J. Brown (born 1941)
William Brown (Illinois politician) (1819–1891)

Indiana
Charlie Brown (Indiana politician) (born 1938)
Ethan Allen Brown (1776–1852)
Jason B. Brown (1839–1898)
Tim Brown (Indiana politician) (born 1956)
William J. Brown (Indiana politician) (1805–1857)

Iowa
Timi Brown-Powers (born 1967)

Kansas
Anthony Brown (Kansas politician)
Tony Brown (Kansas politician)

Kentucky
John Y. Brown Sr. (1900–1985)
Larry L. Brown

Louisiana
Chad Brown (politician) (born 1970)
J. Marshall Brown (1924–?)
Terry Brown (Louisiana politician)

Maine
Marion Fuller Brown (1917–2011)
Dwight A. Brown (1918–1990)
Stewart B. Brown (died 1973)

Massachusetts
Benjamin Brown (politician) (1756–1831)
Russell P. Brown (1891–1965)
Scott Brown (politician) (born 1959)

Michigan
Ammon Brown (1798–1882)
Cameron S. Brown (born 1954)
Jim N. Brown (1926–1991)
John S. Brown (politician) (born  1810)
Lisa Brown (Michigan politician) (born 1967)
Mary Brown (Michigan politician) (born 1935)
Rich Brown (Michigan politician) (born 1956)
Terry Brown (Michigan politician) (born 1959)
Thomas H. Brown (Michigan politician) (1917–2002)
Vernon J. Brown (1874–1964)

Minnesota
Chuck Brown (politician) (1951–2003)
Robin Brown (politician) (born 1961)

Mississippi
Cecil Brown (Mississippi politician) (born 1947)
Chris Brown (Mississippi politician) (born 1971)

Missouri
Benjamin Gratz Brown (1826–1885)
Cloria Brown (1942–2018)
Jason R. Brown (born 1970)
Napoleon Bonaparte Brown (1834–1910)
Wanda Brown (born 1966)
Wilson Brown (politician) (1804–1855)

Montana
Dave Brown (Montana politician) (1948–1998)
Dee Brown (politician) (born 1948)
Roy Brown (Montana politician) (born 1951)

New Hampshire
Pennington Brown
Titus Brown (1786–1849)

New Mexico
Cathrynn Brown

North Carolina
Bedford Brown (1795–1870)
Brian Brown (North Carolina politician) (born 1979)
John Brown (North Carolina politician) (1738–1812)
Larry R. Brown (1943–2012)

Ohio
Edna Brown (born 1940)
Jeremiah A. Brown (1841–1913)
John William Brown (1913–1993)
Les Brown (speaker) (born 1945)
Richard Brown (Ohio politician)
Robert Brown (Ohio politician) (1928–1985)
Seth W. Brown (1841–1923)
Sherrod Brown (born 1952)
Tim Brown (Ohio politician) (born 1962)

Oregon
Kate Brown (born 1960)

Pennsylvania
Charles Brown (congressman) (1797–1883)
Harold L. Brown (born 1946)
Homer S. Brown (1896–1977)
Jeremiah Brown (politician) (1785–1858)
Rosemary Brown (American politician) (born 1970)
Vanessa L. Brown (born 1965)
William Wallace Brown (1836–1926)
Pat Browne (born 1963)

South Carolina
Boyd Brown (born 1986)
Edgar Allan Brown (1888–1975)
Henry E. Brown Jr. (born 1935)
Joe Ellis Brown (1933–2018)
Robert Brown (South Carolina politician) (born 1950)
Walter B. Brown (1920–1998)

South Dakota
Arnold M. Brown (born 1931)

Tennessee
Aaron V. Brown (1795–1859)
Dorothy Lavinia Brown (1919–2004)
Tommie Brown (born 1934)

Texas
Betty Brown (born 1939)
John Brown (Texas politician) (1786–1852)
John Henry Brown (1820–1895)
Raleigh Brown (1921–2009)

Utah
Derek Brown (politician) (born 1971)
Melvin R. Brown (born 1938)

Vermont
Charles Henry Brown (Vermont politician) (1904–1959)

Washington
Lisa Brown (Washington politician) (born 1956)

Wyoming
Kermit Brown (born 1942)
Landon Brown (born 1987)

Hawaiian Kingdom Representatives
Cecil Brown (Hawaii politician) (1850–1917)

See also
List of people with surname Brown
Senator Brown (disambiguation)